Yakov Seleznev (born August 4, 1989) is a Russian professional ice hockey defenceman who currently plays for Beibarys Atyrau of the Supreme Hockey League (VHL). He previously played in the Saryarka Karaganda, Kontinental Hockey League (KHL) for Ak Bars Kazan, Amur Khabarovsk, HC Neftekhimik Nizhnekamsk, HC Spartak Moscow, HC Vityaz and HC Yugra.

References

External links

1989 births
Living people
Ak Bars Kazan players
Amur Khabarovsk players
HC Neftekhimik Nizhnekamsk players
Rubin Tyumen players
HC Spartak Moscow players
HC Vityaz players
HC Yugra players
Russian ice hockey defencemen